Estrée-Cauchy is a commune in the Pas-de-Calais department in the Hauts-de-France region of France.

Geography

It is one of many villages in the north of France bearing the name Estrées. The etymology of the name is from strata (cognate of English "street"), the word for the stone-layered Roman roads in the area (some of which turned into modern highways). Hence Estreti, village on the road which developed into Estrées.

Population

Places of interest
 The church of St.Pierre, dating from the sixteenth century.
 The ruins of a fifteenth-century chateau.

See also
Communes of the Pas-de-Calais department

References

Estreecauchy